George Kemel (1931 – 14 October 2021) was an English professional rugby league footballer who played in the 1950s and 1960s.

Playing career

International honours
George Kemel won caps for Great Britain while at Widnes in 1965 against New Zealand (2 matches).

Challenge Cup Final appearances
George Kemel played  in Widnes' 13–5 victory over Hull Kingston Rovers in the 1964 Challenge Cup Final at Wembley Stadium, London on Saturday 9 May 1964, in front of a crowd of 84,488.

References

1931 births
2021 deaths
English rugby league players
Great Britain national rugby league team players
Rugby league hookers
Rugby league players from Prescot
Widnes Vikings players